The Engine is a fictional device described in the 1726 satirical novel Gulliver's Travels by Jonathan Swift. It is possibly the earliest known reference to a device in any way resembling a modern computer.

The Engine is a device that generates permutations of word sets. It is found at the Academy of Projectors in Lagado and is described thus by Swift:
“... Every one knew how laborious the usual method is of attaining to arts and sciences; whereas, by his contrivance, the most ignorant person, at a reasonable charge, and with a little bodily labour, might write books in philosophy, poetry, politics, laws, mathematics, and theology, without the least assistance from genius or study.” He then led me to the frame, about the sides, whereof all his pupils stood in ranks. It was twenty feet square, placed in the middle of the room. The superfices was composed of several bits of wood, about the bigness of a die, but some larger than others. They were all linked together by slender wires. These bits of wood were covered, on every square, with paper pasted on them; and on these papers were written all the words of their language, in their several moods, tenses, and declensions; but without any order. The professor then desired me “to observe; for he was going to set his engine at work.” The pupils, at his command, took each of them hold of an iron handle, whereof there were forty fixed round the edges of the frame; and giving them a sudden turn, the whole disposition of the words was entirely changed. He then commanded six-and-thirty of the lads, to read the several lines softly, as they appeared upon the frame; and where they found three or four words together that might make part of a sentence, they dictated to the four remaining boys, who were scribes. This work was repeated three or four times, and at every turn, the engine was so contrived, that the words shifted into new places, as the square bits of wood moved upside down."

That story is thought be a satire on medieval philosopher Ramon Llull.

See also

References

External links
 
 

Fictional computers
Gulliver's Travels
Criticism of science
Automated reasoning
Artificial intelligence in fiction